Iñapari Airport  is an airport serving the town of Iñapari, in the Madre de Dios Region of Peru.

See also

Transport in Peru
List of airports in Peru

References

External links
OpenStreetMap - Iñapari
OurAirports - Iñapari

Airports in Peru
Buildings and structures in Madre de Dios Region